Lepidosaphidini is a tribe of armored scale insects.

Genera

Acanthomytilus
Adiscodiaspis
Allantomytilus
Ambigaspis
Andaspis
Anoplaspis
Aonidomytilus
Bayuraspis
Caia
Cephalaspis
Coccomytilus
Cornimytilus
Cornuaspis
Crassaspis
Cynodontaspis
Dactylaspis
Daraspis
Dinaspis
Discodiaspis
Ductofrontaspis
Eucornuaspis
Eulepidosaphes
Evallaspis
Fernaldanna
Ferreroaspis
Ferrisidea
Finaspis
Fulaspis
Galeomytilus
Gynandraspis
Hexandaspis
Howardia
Hulaspis
Ischnaspis
Kandraspis
Koroneaspis
Lapazia
Leonardaspis
Lepidosaphes
Malleolaspis
Maskellanna
Mauritiaspis
Melayumytilus
Mempelaspis
Mercetaspis
Metandaspis
Mimusaspis
Mitraspis
Mitulaspis
Mohelnaspis
Multispinaspis
Mytilaspis
Neopinnaspis
Nilotaspis
Nimbaspis
Niveaspis
Notandaspis
Opuntiaspis
Osiraspis
Palauaspis
Pallulaspis
Pandanaspis
Paradiaspis
Paraepidiaspis
Parainsulaspis
Paralepidosaphes
Parandaspis
Parapandanaspis
Parapudaspis
Parischnaspis
Phaulomytilus
Pinomytilus
Pistaciaspis
Poliaspoides
Praecocaspis
Prodigiaspis
Protargionia
Pseudodiaspis
Pseudoparlatoria
Pudaspis
Pygalataspis
Ramachandraspis
Rugaspidiotinus
Rugaspidiotus
Rugpapuaspis
Santubongi
Saotomaspis
Scleromytilus
Scobinaspis
Scrupulaspis
Scytalaspis
Situlaspis
Stramenaspis
Symeria
Takahashiella
Triaspidis
Triraphaspis
Trischnaspis
Ungulaspis
Velataspis

References

 
Hemiptera tribes
Diaspidinae